Dashgombyn Battulga (born 4 March 1966) is a Mongolian judoka. He competed in the men's extra-lightweight event at the 1992 Summer Olympics.

References

External links
 

1966 births
Living people
Mongolian male judoka
Olympic judoka of Mongolia
Judoka at the 1992 Summer Olympics
Place of birth missing (living people)
Judoka at the 1990 Asian Games
Judoka at the 1994 Asian Games
Asian Games medalists in judo
Asian Games bronze medalists for Mongolia
Medalists at the 1990 Asian Games
Medalists at the 1994 Asian Games
Competitors at the 1990 Goodwill Games
20th-century Mongolian people
21st-century Mongolian people